Union is a home rule-class city in Boone County, Kentucky, United States. The population was 7,416 . The area was rural until residential growth in the 1990s and 2000s.

Geography
Union is located at  (38.945185, -84.671866).

The city of Union has a defined city boundary, which does not include all of the addresses defined as Union by the United States Postal Service.  Some nearby communities, including Triple Crown Country Club, Cool Springs and Brigadoon, have Union addresses but are not part of the incorporated city and are in unincorporated Boone County.

Demographics
As of the census of 2010, there were 5,379 people, 1,661 households, and 1,471 families residing in the city. The racial makeup of the city was 91.3% White, 1.2% African American, 0.0% Native American, 5.7% Asian, 0.0% Pacific Islander, 0.0% from other races, and 1.7% from two or more races. Hispanic or Latino of any race were 1.8% of the population.

There were 850 households, out of which 62.9% included children under the age of 18. 85.3% were married couples living together, 5.1% had a female householder with no husband present, and 7.8% were non-families. 5.9% of all households were made up of individuals, and 1.8% had someone living alone who was 65 years of age or older. The average household size was 3.40 and the average family size was 3.55.
In the city, the population age ranges included 37.6% under the age of 18, 4.8% from 18 to 24, 35.9% from 25 to 44, 19.4% from 45 to 64, and 2.3% who were 65 years of age or older. The median age was 32 years. For every 100 females, there were 100.3 males. For every 100 females age 18 and over, there were 100.9 males.

The median income for a household in the city was $85,454, and the median income for a family was $85,859 (2009 estimates indicate a rise to $97,083 and $98,672, respectively). Males had a median income of $61,531 versus $34,861 for females. The per capita income for the city was $27,626. About 1.4% of families and 1.4% of the population were below the poverty line, including 1.1% of those under age 18 and 3.0% of those age 65 or over.

Government 
 Administration of city functions is separated into departments by ordinance, and each of these departments is placed under the supervision of one of the city commissioners unless the city has created the position of city administrative officer.

Emergency medical treatment and transportation, fire suppression, rescue, and many other emergency and non-emergency services in the city are provided by the Union Fire Protection District, operating under Fire Chief Michael Morgan.

Law enforcement in the city is performed by the Boone County Sheriff's Office, which employs nearly 200 sworn deputies and 80 deputies assigned to Patrol and Traffic Divisions and is led by Sheriff Michael A Helmig.

On July 8, 2022, Union Mayor Larry Solomon was joined by Boone County Judge-Executive Gary Moore and officials from Cincinnati Children's Hospital to break ground on Union Promenade, a $150 million Live/Work/Place concept co-developed by T.J. Ackermann of Thomas J. Ackermann Company, Inc., and Ralph Meierjohan of Meierjohan Building Group.

Neighborhoods 

 Ballyshannon
 Cedarwood
 Hampshire Estates
 Harmony
 Hawks Landing
Hempsteade
 Indian Hill
 Ivy Pond
 Lassing Green
 Orleans
 Orleans North
 Russwill
 Sycamore
 Whispering Trail
 Union Bluff
 Union Station
 Triple Crown
Traemore
Arbor Springs
Westbrook

Education

Schools and libraries 
The City of Union is home to six public schools, all part of Boone County Schools:

Elementary School:

 Longbranch Elementary
 New Haven Elementary
 Shirley Mann Elementary

Middle School:

 Ballyshannon Middle School
 Gray Middle School

High School:
Cooper High School
 Larry A. Ryle High School

Union has a public library, Scheben Branch, which is an installation of the Boone County Public Library system.

Transportation

Roadways and freeways 
The city of Union is served by two US Highways (US 42 and US 127) and three Kentucky Routes (237, 536, and 2953).  Concurrent Interstates 71/75 connect the city directly to Cincinnati (northbound) and Lexington/Louisville (southbound).

Airports 
Air travel is provided by the Cincinnati/Northern Kentucky International Airport.  It is less than 20 miles away via Interstates 71/75 and Interstate 275.

Notable people
 Steve Flesch (golfer)
 Josh Hutcherson (actor)
 Paul Marcotte (businessman and politician)
 Tanner Morgan (football player)

References

External links
 Official Homepage
 Boone County Arboretum
 Weather Forecasts for Union
 Triple Crown Country Club
 Triple Crown Community
 Hempsteade Community
 Hampshire Community
 Harmony Community
 Orleans (South) Community
 Plantation Pointe Community

 
Cities in Boone County, Kentucky
Cities in Kentucky